Gábor Bukrán (born 16 November 1975) is a Hungarian former professional footballer who played as a midfielder. His most recent team was Belgian lower division side Royal Cercle Sportif Onhaye.

Early life
Bukrán was born in Eger.

Club career
He began his career in 1992 with Budapest Honvéd before moving to Belgian First Division side Charleroi in 1993. Bukrán helped Charleroi to a fourth-place finish in 1993–94 and qualification for European competition in three out of his four years in Belgium.

In 1997 he moved to Spain to play for Córdoba CF in the Segunda División B. After only one season he moved to Xerez CD, who also played in Segunda División B. In his two years in Spain, Bukrán played 47 league games and scored 5 goals.

In the summer of 1999 Bukrán came to the attention of English side Walsall and on 5 August 1999 he signed a two-year contract with the newly promoted First Division side. He quickly became a fans' favourite but could not prevent the team's relegation on the final day of the season. The 2000–01 season was a much happier one as Bukrán helped Walsall to promotion back to the First Division via the Second Division play-off Final, beating Reading 3–2 at Cardiff's Millennium Stadium.

After leaving Walsall, Bukrán spent a very brief spell at Wigan Athletic, where he only managed one appearance, before moving to Austrian side SV Salzburg. He spent two years at Salzburg before returning to Belgium with Royal Antwerp in 2003. He played out the remainder of his career in Belgium with Union Royale Namur, R. JS Heppignies and R.C.S. Onhaye.

International career

Bukran made his international debut for Hungary in a 3–0 friendly defeat to Australia in February 2000. Despite being selected in the squad for the majority of Hungary's Euro 2000 Qualifying campaign, his debut turned out to be his first and last international appearance.

Honours
with Walsall
Football League Second Division play-off winner: 2001

References

External links
Player profile at PlayerHistory.com

Player profile at FootballPlus.com

1975 births
Living people
Sportspeople from Eger
Hungarian footballers
Association football midfielders
Hungary international footballers
Budapest Honvéd FC players
Hungarian expatriate footballers
Expatriate footballers in Belgium
R. Charleroi S.C. players
Hungarian expatriate sportspeople in Belgium
Expatriate footballers in Spain
Córdoba CF players
Hungarian expatriate sportspeople in Spain
Xerez CD footballers
Expatriate footballers in England
Walsall F.C. players
Hungarian expatriate sportspeople in England
Wigan Athletic F.C. players
Expatriate footballers in Austria
FC Red Bull Salzburg players
Hungarian expatriate sportspeople in Austria
Royal Antwerp F.C. players
Union Royale Namur Fosses-La-Ville players